Fort Cocke was a  stockade, made of wooden palisades up stream from Fort Ashby. It was a square ninety feet on a side and enclosed about 1/5 acre. Blockhouses were built at each of the four corners. A barracks to house fifty men was constructed within the stockade.
It was built by Captain William Cocke's First Company of Rangers under orders of George Washington dated October 26, 1755.  It has been suggested that the fort was probably completed within a month.

It was constructed south of George Parker's land. This was on Lot 13 of the Lord Fairfax's Patterson Creek Manor.

Being it was small, Fort Cocke was a place of limited refuge for settlers living in the Pattersons Creek Valley. After the capture of Fort Duquesne, troops garrisoning the fort were gradually withdrawn. In a 1770 trip down Pattersons Creek George Washington pointed out the place where the fort had stood indicating it has fallen to nothing within 15 years.

See also
Fort Ashby
Fort Ohio
Fort Sellers

References 

Landmarks in West Virginia
Buildings and structures in Mineral County, West Virginia
Cocke
Cocke
Cocke
Cocke
1755 establishments in the Thirteen Colonies